Aziz Akhannouch (born 31 December 1961) is a Moroccan politician, businessman, and billionaire who is currently the Prime Minister of Morocco since his government took office on 7 October 2021. He is the CEO of Akwa Group and also served as Minister of Agriculture from 2007 to 2021.

Akhannouch's political career has been generally characterized by accusations of corruption, negative relations with the press, and other controversies. His government has been additionally marked by inflation, and suppression of dissenting opinion and imprisonment of opponents. It has been suggested that Akhannouch may have been elected by election fraud and vote buying, as the previous party, the PJD saw its support collapse from 125 to just 12 seats. Several popular boycotts and campaigns were organized against his administration and business interests, including the #Degage_Akhannouch campaign.

Early life and education
Akhannouch was born in 1961 in Tafraout and raised in Casablanca. His mother and sister were survivors of the 1960 Agadir earthquake that killed ten of his family members: they were reported to have been left buried beneath rubble for several hours before being rescued.

In 1986, Akhannouch graduated from the Université de Sherbrooke with a management diploma.

Business
He is the CEO of Akwa Group, a Moroccan conglomerate particularly active in the oil and gas sector. Forbes estimated his net worth as $1.4 billion in November 2013. Akhannouch inherited Akwa from his father. In 2020, he was ranked 12th on Forbess annual list of Africa's wealthiest billionaires, with an estimated net worth of $2 billion.

Political career
From 2003 to 2007, Akhannouch was the president of the Souss-Massa-Drâa regional council. He was a member of the National Rally of Independents Party, before leaving it on 2 January 2012.
On 23 August 2013 he was appointed by King Mohammed VI as Minister of Finance on an interim basis after Istiqlal ministers resigned from Benkirane's cabinet, a position he kept until 9 October 2013. On 29 October 2016, Akhannouch rejoined the RNI after being elected the president of the party. He took over Salaheddine Mezouar's position, who had resigned.

On 27 July 2016, Akhannouch met with Jonathan Pershing, Special Envoy for Climate Change for the United States. They spoke about preparations for the 2016 United Nations Conference of the Parties.

In March 2020, through his company Afriquia, a subsidiary of the Akwa group, Akhannouch donated roughly one billion dirhams ($103.5 million) to a COVID-19 pandemic management fund founded by King Mohammed VI.

Prime Minister of Morocco (2021—present)
In the 2021 general election, his party placed first, winning 222 seats of the 435 seats, while the governing Justice and Development Party lost 113 of its previous seats. On 10 September 2021, he was appointed as Prime Minister by King Mohammed VI, succeeding Saadeddine Othmani, and was tasked by the King to form a new government.

Akhannouch announced the formation of an official coalition government alongside the PAM and Istiqlal parties on 22 September 2021, thus officializing his status as Prime Minister of Morocco.

On 7 October 2021, Akhannouch assumed office as the new Prime Minister.

In late October, Akhannouch represented King Mohammed VI at a Green Initiative event in Saudi Arabia, and was criticized by Moroccan citizens for wearing a pin of the MENA region that excluded Western Sahara.

In September 2022, Akhannouch attended the 77th session of the United Nations General Assembly in New York.

On 11 October 2022, Akhannouch met with Prince Guillaume, Hereditary Grand Duke of Luxembourg along with his business partners in Rabat, in order to boost economic trade between Morocco and Luxembourg.

On 1 February 2023, Akhannouch met with the Spanish prime minister Pedro Sánchez, in Rabat to conduct the 12th edition of the Morocco-Spain High Level Meeting. in which both countries signed a total of 19 bilateral agreements concerning a plethora of sectors.

Controversies
Akhannouch was the target of several accusations of corruption during his time as Minister of Agriculture. In 2017, the Secretary General of the Istiqlal Party, Hamid Chabat, accused him of stealing 13 billion Moroccan dirhams intended to go towards gas compensation during a party meeting. At a previous gathering in Fez, he additionally accused Akhannouch of corruption, and implied that his $2 billion fortune was the equivalent of "all that 30 million Moroccans own". An open letter to King Mohammed VI from blogger Maysa Salama al-Naji published online in June 2021 cited a 400-page report counting corruption charges against Akhannouch.

Akhannouch has been criticized for suppressing dissenting opinions and imprisoning opponents, while the people called for an end to these grave violations, the repression of human rights activists, the silencing of free speech, the suppression of free opinion, and the right to peaceful demonstration.

17 billion case
In 2015 and 2016, after the Moroccan government of Abdelilah Benkirane decided to liberalize fuel prices, the fuel companies decided to collude with each other and not reduce prices. Among those companies was the Akwa company, owned by Akhannouch.

The profits of these companies amounted to about 17 billion dirhams (around US$1.75 billion), and several parties described them as immoral and illegal profits on the back of the Moroccan people. There were still several demands to restore them, whether in Parliament or in the media.

During the period following the case, the president of the Competition Council, prepared a report on Akhannouch's illegal profits, and submitted it to King Mohammed VI. In March 2021, Guerraoui was relieved of his position and replaced by Ahmed Rahhou.

Press relations
As of 2016, the Ministry of Agriculture spent several million dirhams annually in massive advertising in the country's print press. If a newspaper criticized Akhannouch or his Maroc Vert plan, it immediately saw the Ministry's advertisements cut off, along with those of the Akwa group.

In 2017, Akhannouch sued three journalists from the Badil news site for having criticized him. He demanded that they pay him 1 million dirhams.

2018 boycott

In the spring of 2018, Morocco was shaken by a boycott movement launched against Centrale Danone, Sidi Ali (mineral water) and Akwa's subsidiary Afriquia. These three brands, leaders in three basic products – milk, water and fuel – were accused by the population of charging very high prices. The movement became extremely popular, leading to reactions from the government.

According to the French think tank School of Thought on Economic Warfare (EPGE), which investigated the boycott movement, it would be a campaign of disinformation “hierarchized therefore orchestrated by a precise political agenda”. This destabilization initiative would even have benefited from a substantial budget, with for example between 100,000 and 500,000 euros for the purchase of online space to disseminate the ideas of the movement. To this must be added expensive donation campaigns to the poor to mobilize public opinion. According to the same study, the movement of Al Adl Wa Al Ihssan would be behind this boycott campaign with the aim of removing Akhanouch from the political scene.

Akhannouch himself said he "ignored" the boycott campaign while speaking to Jeune Afrique, accusing opponents of "exploiting Moroccans' hardship for political goals".

On 17 November 2018, the King reacted by appointing Driss Guerraoui as president of the Competition Council. In 2020, the Council recognized that the three brands targeted by the 2018 boycott campaign had reached an agreement on prices.

Milan comments
In December 2019, during a meeting in Milan with Moroccans living in Italy, Akhannouch declared, "Whoever believes that they can come and insult the institutions of the country has no place in Morocco. Whoever wants to live in Morocco must respect its motto and its democracy. Insults will not move us forward. And excuse me, but it is not justice that should do this job. […] We must re-educate Moroccans who lack education." The remarks triggered strong reactions from Moroccan politicians and netizens as well as a call for the resuming of the 2018 boycott of his companies. TelQuel attributed his comments in relation to the arrest & prosecution of a Moroccan YouTuber after he published a video criticizing King Mohammed VI's speeches. The Milan comments were alluded to in the popular music video "M3a L3echrane" by Dizzy DROS.

2021 election
In the runup to the 2021 general election, Abdellatif Ouahbi, Secretary General of the Authenticity and Modernity Party which later joined the government coalition, accused Akhannouch of "flooding the political scene with money", while the Justice and Development Party heading the outgoing coalition condemned the "obscene use of funds to lure voters and some polling station supervisors", without naming any parties. Additionally, the party also alleged "serious irregularities" in the voting process. Nabil Benabdallah, head of the Party of Progress and Socialism, criticized the RNI during an interview for giving sums of money to lure candidates from other parties "in full view of everyone". An RNI spokesperson contacted by Agence France-Presse said the accusations had been "rejected" by the party, and declined any further comments.

Rising prices and inflation
Throughout less than 200 days into Akhannouch's time in office, he became a target of Moroccans calling for his resignation, accusing him of corruption. The prices of fuel and several essential food products have skyrocketed in recent months, as the price of a 5-litre bottle of vegetable oil increased by 27 dirhams, while the price of 25 kg of semolina, widely used in Moroccan cuisine, increased by 50 dirhams. The inflation affected many vulnerable families, in which more than 430,000 Moroccans lost their jobs.

#Degage_Akhannouch campaign 
In 2022, as fuel prices continued to rise, an online campaign emerged with tens of thousands of users on Twitter and Facebook using the three French hashtags #7dh_Gazoil, #8dh_Essence and #Degage_Akhannouch ("Get out Akhannouch") to call for an immediate decrease in gas prices, accusing Akhannouch and his company Afriquia of benefiting from the crisis. Abdelilah Benkirane, head of the Justice and Development Party (PJD) and former Prime Minister, said that he "didn't support" the online campaign, adding that "only Sidna (our lord) [King Mohammed VI] has the competence (…) to put an end to this cabinet and call for the organisation of early legislative elections". Nevertheless, several PJD members participated in the campaign.

Personal life
Akhannouch is married to Salwa Idrissi, a businesswoman who owns a company active in malls and holds the Moroccan franchises for brands such as Gap and Zara. They have three children.

As Minister of Agriculture, Akhannouch hosted King Mohammed VI and his immediate family for Ramadan iftar on two separate occasions in 2013 and 2016.

On 21 November 2022, Akhannouch reportedly tested positive for COVID-19.

References

External links

Biography at the ministry of agriculture official website
Official website of the Moroccan ministry of agriculture

|-

|-

|-

Berber Moroccans
Moroccan Berber politicians
Moroccan billionaires
Moroccan businesspeople
People from Tafraout
1961 births
Living people
Moroccan chief executives
Shilha people
Université de Sherbrooke alumni
National Rally of Independents politicians
Prime Ministers of Morocco